Essential fatty acids, or EFAs, are fatty acids that humans and other animals must ingest because the body requires them for good health but cannot synthesize them. 

Only two fatty acids are known to be essential for humans: alpha-linolenic acid (an omega-3 fatty acid) and linoleic acid (an omega-6 fatty acid).  These are supplied to the body both as the free fatty acid or more commonly as some glyceride derivative.  Deficiency in these fatty acids is rare.  These fatty acids are essential because they are precursors to vitamins, cofactors.  These derivatives include prostaglandins, leukotrienes, thromboxanes, lipoxins, and others.

When the two EFAs were discovered in 1923, they were designated "vitamin F", but in 1929, research on rats showed that the two EFAs are better classified as fats rather than vitamins.

Functions

In the body, essential fatty acids serve multiple functions. In each of these, the balance between dietary ω-3 and ω-6 strongly affects function.
They are modified to make 
the classic eicosanoids (affecting inflammation and many other cellular functions)
the endocannabinoids (affecting mood, behavior and inflammation)
the lipoxins which are a group of eicosanoid derivatives formed via the lipoxygenase pathway from ω-6 EFAs and resolvins from ω-3 (in the presence of acetylsalicylic acid, downregulating inflammation)
the isofurans, neurofurans, isoprostanes, hepoxilins, epoxyeicosatrienoic acids (EETs) and neuroprotectin D
They form lipid rafts (affecting cellular signaling)
They act on DNA (activating or inhibiting transcription factors such as NF-κB, which is linked to pro-inflammatory cytokine production)

Nomenclature and terminology

Fatty acids comprise an aliphatic hydrocarbon chain plus a carboxyl group (–COOH) group at one end, and terminated by a methyl group (–CH3) at the other end. They are almost always straight-chained. The carbon next to the carboxylate is known as α, the next carbon β, and so forth. Since biological fatty acids can be of diverse lengths, the last position is often labelled as a "ω", the last letter in the Greek alphabet. Thus, the ω-3 indicates that the first unsaturated carbon-carbon bond from the terminal end (ω) of the chain is the third one. Typically, the number of carbons and the number of double bonds are also listed in short descriptions of unsaturated fatty acids. For instance, ω-3 18:4, or 18:4 ω-3, or 18:4 n−3 indicates stearidonic acid, an 18-carbon chain with 4 double bonds, and with a double bond between the third and fourth carbon atoms from the CH3 end. Double bonds are cis and separated by a single methylene (CH2) group unless otherwise noted. In free fatty acid form, the chemical structure of stearidonic acid is:

Examples
Polyunsaturated fatty acids with 16- and 18-carbon chains are sometimes classified as short chain polyunsaturated fatty acids (SC-PUFA), as opposed to long-chain polyunsaturated fatty acids (LC-PUFA), which have more than 18 carbon atoms.

Both the essential fatty acids are SC-PUFA with an 18-carbon chain:
ω-3 fatty acid: 
α-linolenic acid or ALA (18:3n-3)
ω-6 fatty acid: 
linoleic acid or LA (18:2n-6)
These two fatty acids cannot be synthesized by humans because humans lack the desaturase enzymes required for their production.

They form the starting point for the creation of more desaturated fatty acids, most of which also have a longer carbon chain:
ω-3 fatty acids: 
eicosapentaenoic acid or EPA (20:5n-3)
docosahexaenoic acid or DHA (22:6n-3) 
ω-6 fatty acids: 
gamma-linolenic acid or GLA (18:3n-6)
dihomo-gamma-linolenic acid or DGLA (20:3n-6)
arachidonic acid or AA (20:4n-6)
Except for GLA, which has a short 18-carbon chain, these fatty acids have more than 18 carbon atoms and are typically classified as LC-PUFA.

ω-9 fatty acids are not essential in humans because they can be synthesized from carbohydrates or other fatty acids.

Essentiality in human diet
Mammals lack the ability to introduce double bonds in fatty acids beyond carbon 9 and 10, hence the omega-6 linoleic acid (18:2n-6; LA) and the omega-3 alpha-linolenic acid (18:3n-3; ALA) are essential for humans in the diet. However, humans can convert both LA and ALA to fatty acids with longer carbon chains and a larger number of double bonds, by alternative desaturation and chain elongation.

In humans, arachidonic acid (20:4n-6; AA) can be synthesized from LA. In turn, AA can be converted to an even longer fatty acid, the docosapentaenoic acid (22:5n-6; DPA). Similarly, ALA can be converted to docosahexaenoic acid (22:6n-3; DHA), although the latter conversion is limited, resulting in lower blood levels of DHA than through direct ingestion. This is illustrated by studies in vegans and vegetarians. If there is relatively more LA than ALA in the diet it favors the formation of DPA from LA rather than DHA from ALA. This effect can be altered by changing the relative ratio of LA:ALA, but is more effective when total intake of polyunsaturated fatty acids is low.

In preterm infants, the capacity to convert LA to AA and ALA to DHA is limited, and preformed AA and DHA may be required to meet the needs of the developing brain. Both AA and DHA are present in breastmilk and contribute along with the parent fatty acids LA and ALA to meeting the requirements of the newborn infant. Many infant formulas have AA and DHA added to them with an aim to make them more equivalent to human milk.

Essential nutrients are defined as those that cannot be synthesized de novo in sufficient quantities for normal physiological function. This definition is met for LA and ALA but not the longer chain derivatives in adults. The longer chain derivatives particularly, however, have pharmacological properties that can modulate disease processes, but this should not be confused with dietary essentiality.

One study demonstrated linoleic acid deficiency in adults. They found that patients undergoing intravenous nutrition with glucose became isolated from their fat supplies and rapidly developed biochemical signs of essential fatty acid deficiency (an increase in 20:3n-9/20:4n-6 ratio in plasma) and skin symptoms. This could be treated by infusing lipids, and later studies showed that topical application of sunflower oil would also resolve the dermal symptoms. Linoleic acid has a specific role in maintaining the skin water-permeability barrier, probably as constituents of acylglycosylceramides. This role cannot be met by any ω-3 fatty acids or by arachidonic acid.

The main physiological requirement for ω-6 fatty acids is attributed to arachidonic acid, which is the major precursor of prostaglandins, leukotrienes that play a vital role in cell signaling, and an endogenous cannabinoid anandamide. Metabolites from the ω-3 pathway, mainly from eicosapentaenoic acid, are mostly inactive.

Reviews by the European Food Safety Authority made recommendations for minimal intakes of LA and ALA and have also recommended intakes of longer chain ω-3 fatty acids based on the association of oily fish consumption with a lower risk of cardiovascular disease.

Food sources

Some of the food sources of ω-3 and ω-6 fatty acids are fish and shellfish, seaweed oil, flaxseed (linseed) and flaxseed oil, hemp seed, olive oil, soya oil, canola (rapeseed) oil, chia seeds, pumpkin seeds, sunflower seeds, leafy vegetables, and walnuts.

Essential fatty acids play a part in many metabolic processes, and there is evidence to suggest that low levels of essential fatty acids, or the wrong balance of types among the essential fatty acids, may be a factor in a number of illnesses, including osteoporosis.

Fish is the main source of the longer omega-3 fats; eicosapentaenoic acid (EPA) and docosahexaenoic acid (DHA), though they initially acquire these fats through the consumption of algae and seaweed. Some plant-based foods contain omega-3 in the form of alpha-linolenic acid (ALA), which appears to have a modest benefit for cardiovascular health. The human body can (and in case of a purely vegetarian diet often must unless certain algae or supplements derived from them are consumed) convert ALA to EPA and subsequently DHA. This elongation of ALA is inefficient. Conversion to DHA is higher in women than in men; this is thought to reflect the need to provide DHA to the fetus and infant during pregnancy and breast feeding.

The IUPAC Lipid Handbook provides a very large and detailed listing of fat contents of animal and vegetable fats, including ω-3 and -6 oils. The National Institutes of Health's EFA Education group publishes Essential Fats in Food Oils. This lists 40 common oils, more tightly focused on EFAs and sorted by n-6:3 ratio. Vegetable Lipids as Components of Functional Food lists notable vegetable sources of EFAs as well as commentary and an overview of the biosynthetic pathways involved. However, these sources are not in perfect agreement. EFA content of vegetable sources varies with cultivation conditions. Animal sources vary widely, both with the animal's feed and that the EFA makeup varies markedly with fats from different body parts.

Human health

Essential fatty acids play an important role in the life and death of cardiac cells. Additionally, essential fatty acids are crucial for the development of several endocannabinoids with a multitude of functions in the body, such as Docosahexaenoyl ethanolamide (DHA-EA/synaptamide). Many omega-3 and omega-6 derived essential fatty acids act similarly to endocannabinoids such as anandamide and 2-AG, possessing activity at the CB1 and CB2 receptors, among others. 29

Reference intake values 
Reference intake values for as published by the Panel on Dietetic Products, Nutrition and Allergies of the European Food Safety Authority (EFSA).

In the United States, the Adequate Intake (AI) for omega-3 fatty acids is for ALA. It is based on the median intake, and for adults the values are 1.6 g/day for men and 1.1 g/day for women. EPA and DHA contribute about 10 percent of total omega-3 intake. The AI for omega-6 fatty acids is for linoleic acid and is also based on the median intake: 17 g/day for younger men, dropping to 14 g/day for men over 50 years old; for younger women 12 g/d, and 11 g/day for women over 50. Studies have shown that smaller intakes reverse the symptoms of deficiency, but there is inadequate information to set an Estimated Average Requirement (EAR) for either.

Essential fatty acid deficiency
Essential fatty acid deficiency results in a dermatitis similar to that seen in zinc or biotin deficiency.

See also

Eicosanoid
Hydroxyeicosatetraenoic acid
Leukotriene
Prostaglandin
Thromboxane
Specialized proresolving mediators
Essential amino acid
Essential fatty acid interactions
Fatty acid metabolism
Fatty acid synthase
Krill oil
Nonclassic eicosanoid
Oily fish
Omega-3 fatty acid
Omega-6 fatty acid
Polyunsaturated fat

References